The International Society for the History of Medicine is a non profit international society devoted to the academic study of the history of medicine, including the organization of international congresses. The Society was founded in 1920 in Belgium. 

The society is present in 50 countries, holds delegations in 38 countries, and has about 800 members. It also includes national societies in Argentina, Belgium, Chile, Finland, France, Greece, Mexico, Morocco, Romania, Turkey, and the United Kingdom. Membership is open to both physicians and historians.

International congresses 
The society holds a biennial International Congress, and, beginning in 2001, an international meeting in the years the main conference is not held. See the list of Congresses and of Meetings. Communications to the international congresses are peer reviewed.

Vesalius 
The ISHM publishes twice a year Vesalius, subtitled Acta Internationalia Historiae Medicinae, an academic journal publishing some abstracts from its International Congresses and International Meetings for the History of Medicine, and some other scientific communications.

Presidents

References

External links 
 
 Vesalius  Old website at: 

History of medicine
History organizations